Parliamentary expenses scandal may refer to:
Canadian Senate expenses scandal, 2012
Nova Scotia parliamentary expenses scandal, 2010
United Kingdom parliamentary expenses scandal, 2009